Kulig is a rural locality (a selo) in Lyakhlinsky Selsoviet, Khivsky District, Republic of Dagestan, Russia. The population was 120 as of 2010.

Geography 
Kulig is located 23 km north of Khiv (the district's administrative centre) by road. Vertil is the nearest rural locality.

References 

Rural localities in Khivsky District